Aphrodite was the World War II code name of a United States Army Air Forces operation to use Boeing B-17 Flying Fortress and Consolidated PB4Y bombers as precision-guided munitions against bunkers and other hardened/reinforced enemy facilities. A parallel project in the United States Navy was codenamed Anvil. The missions were not generally successful, and the intended targets in Europe were either overrun by the ground advance of Allied troops or disabled by conventional attacks by aircraft.

Proposal
The plan called for B-17E/Fs that had been taken out of operational service (various nicknames existed such as "robot", "baby", "drone" or "weary Willy") to be loaded to capacity with explosives, and flown by radio control into bomb-resistant fortifications such as German U-boat pens and V-weapon sites.

By late 1943, General Henry H. Arnold had directed Brigadier General Grandison Gardner's electronic engineers at Eglin Field, Florida, to outfit war-weary bombers with automatic pilots so that they could be remotely controlled. The plan was first proposed to Major General Jimmy Doolittle some time in 1944. Doolittle approved the plan for Operation Aphrodite on 26 June, and assigned the 3rd Bombardment Division with preparing and flying the drone aircraft, which was to be designated BQ-7. The USAAF also planned to outfit war-weary B-24 Liberators with explosives and automatic pilots to be used against defended targets in Japan, under the designation BQ-8.

Final assignment of responsibility was given to the 562nd Bomb Squadron at RAF Honington in Suffolk. Similarly, on 6 July 1944, the U.S. Navy Special Attack Unit (SAU-1) was formed under ComAirLant, with Commander James A. Smith, Officer in Charge, for transfer without delay to Commander Fleet Air Wing 7 in Europe to attack German V-1 and V-2 sites with PB4Y-1s converted to assault drones.

Procedure

To allow easier exit when the pilot and co-pilot were to parachute out, the canopy was removed. Azon radio remote-control equipment was added, with two television cameras fitted in the cockpit to allow a view of both the ground and the main instrumentation panel to be transmitted back to an accompanying B-17 "CQ-4" 'mothership'.

The drone was loaded with explosives weighing more than twice that of a B-17's normal bomb payload. The British Torpex (from "Torpedo Explosive") used for the purpose was itself 50% more powerful than TNT alone.

A relatively remote location in Norfolk, RAF Fersfield, was the launch site. Initially, RAF Woodbridge had been selected for its long runway, but the possibility of a damaged aircraft that diverted to Woodbridge for landings colliding with a loaded drone caused concerns. The remote control system was insufficient for safe takeoff, so each drone was taken aloft by a volunteer crew of a pilot and a flight engineer to an altitude of 2,000 ft (600 m) for transfer of control to the CQ-4 operators. After successful turnover of control of the drone, the two-man crew would arm the payload and parachute out of the cockpit. The 'mothership' would then direct the missile to the target.

When the training program was complete, the 562nd Squadron had ten drones and four "motherships".

For Anvil, the controller aircraft was a Lockheed PV-1, a B-17 accompanied to receive the television signals.

Service history
It was hoped that Operation Aphrodite and Operation Anvil would match the British success with Tallboy and Grand Slam ground penetration bombs but the project was dangerous, expensive and ultimately unsuccessful. Of 14 missions flown, none resulted in the successful destruction of a target. Many aircraft lost control and crashed or were shot down by flak, and many pilots were killed, though a handful of aircraft scored near misses. One notable pilot death was that of Lt Joseph P. Kennedy, Jr., USNR, the elder brother of future US President John F. Kennedy. The program effectively ceased on 27 January 1945 when General Spaatz sent an urgent message to Doolittle: "Aphrodite babies must not be launched against the enemy until further orders".

Missions

See also
 Mistel, a contemporary German drone

References

Further reading
 

World War II weapons of the United States
World War II strategic bombing conducted by the United States
1944 in aviation
Guided missiles of the United States
Boeing B-17 Flying Fortress